Ciudad de Lorca Club de Fútbol was a Spanish football club based in Lorca in the Region of Murcia. Founded in 2008, it disappeared one year later; the club's home ground was Estadio Alfonso Embarre, which held 2,000 spectators.

History
Ciudad de Lorca Club de Fútbol was founded in 2008 by a local business man. It started competing immediately in Tercera División, but was dissolved after only one season, due to many debts.

Club background
Cartagena Promesas (2004–07)
Imperial Promesas (2007–08)
Ciudad de Lorca Club de Fútbol (2008–09)

Season to season

1 season in Tercera División

External links
Futbolme team profile 

Defunct football clubs in the Region of Murcia
Association football clubs established in 2008
Association football clubs disestablished in 2009
Lorca, Spain
2008 establishments in Spain
2009 disestablishments in Spain